Fougèrite is a relatively recently described naturally occurring green rust mineral. It is the archetype of the fougèrite group in the larger hydrotalcite supergroup of naturally occurring layered double hydroxides. The structure is based on brucite-like layers containing Fe2+ and Fe3+ cations, O2− and OH− anions, with loosely bound [CO3]2− groups and H2O molecules between the layers. Fougèrite crystallizes in trigonal system. The ideal formula for fougèrite is [Fe2+4Fe3+2(OH)12][CO3]·3H2O. Higher degrees of oxidation produce the other members of the fougèrite group, namely trébeurdenite, [Fe2+2Fe3+4O2(OH)10][CO3]·3H2O and mössbauerite, [Fe3+6O4(OH)8][CO3]·3H2O.

Fougèrite was first found in forested soils near Fougères, Brittany, France, and recognised as a valid mineral species by the International Mineralogical Association in 2002. It is blue-green to bluish-gray in colour, and resembles clay minerals in habit, forming hexagonal platelets of submicron diameter. In this environment, it is intimately intergrown with trébeurdenite, to give varying overall ratios of Fe2+:Fe3+. The existence of two intergrown fixed-composition phases has been demonstrated by Mössbauer spectroscopy. The mineral is unstable in air, and decomposes by oxidation, dehydration and decarbonation, to ferrihydrite, and ultimately to lepidocrocite or goethite, Fe3+O(OH).

See also
 Clay minerals
 Gley soil
 Iron(II) hydroxide

References

Iron(II,III) minerals
Magnesium minerals
Hydroxide minerals
Clay minerals group
Hydrates
Pedology
Corrosion
Hydroxides
Trigonal minerals
Minerals in space group 166